is a Japanese ski jumper. She was born in Nagano. She was part of the Japanese team that won gold medals at the 2012 Junior World Championships in Erzurum. She also won a team gold medal at the 2014 Junior World Championships in Val di Fiemme. She competed at the 2014 Winter Olympics in Sochi, in the ladies normal hill.

References

External links

1996 births
Living people
People from Nagano (city)
Ski jumpers at the 2014 Winter Olympics
Japanese female ski jumpers
Olympic ski jumpers of Japan
20th-century Japanese women
21st-century Japanese women